USA-232, also known as GPS IIF-2, and GPS SVN-63, is an American navigation satellite which forms part of the Global Positioning System. It was the second of twelve Block IIF satellites to be launched.

Built by Boeing and launched by United Launch Alliance, USA-232 was launched at 06:41 UTC on 16 July 2011, atop a Delta IV carrier rocket, flight number D355, flying in the Medium+(4,2) configuration. The launch took place from Space Launch Complex 37B at the Cape Canaveral Air Force Station, and placed USA-232 directly into medium Earth orbit.

It is used to broadcast the PRN 01 signal, and operates in slot 2 of plane D of the GPS constellation.
 As of 2019 it remains in service.

References

Spacecraft launched in 2011
GPS satellites
USA satellites
Spacecraft launched by Delta IV rockets